Pratapgarh is one of the 60 Legislative Assembly constituencies of Tripura state in India. It is in West Tripura district and is reserved for candidates belonging to the Scheduled Castes. It is also part of West Tripura Lok Sabha constituency.

Members of Legislative Assembly
 1972: Madhu Sudhan Das, Indian National Congress
 1977: Anil Sarkar, Communist Party of India (Marxist)
 1983: Anil Sarkar, Communist Party of India (Marxist)
 1988: Anil Sarkar, Communist Party of India (Marxist)
 1993: Anil Sarkar, Communist Party of India (Marxist)
 1998: Anil Sarkar, Communist Party of India (Marxist)
 2003: Anil Sarkar, Communist Party of India (Marxist)
 2008: Anil Sarkar, Communist Party of India (Marxist)
 2013: Anil Sarkar, Communist Party of India (Marxist)
 2015 (By-Election): Ramu Das, Communist Party of India (Marxist)
2018: Rebati Mohan Das, Bharatiya Janata Party

Election results

2018 election

2015 by-election

See also
List of constituencies of the Tripura Legislative Assembly
 West Tripura district
 Pratapgarh
 Tripura West (Lok Sabha constituency)

References

West Tripura district
Assembly constituencies of Tripura